The heart beats according to a rhythm set up by the sinus node or pacemaker. It is acted on by the nervous system, as well as hormones in the blood, and venous return: the amount of blood being returned to the heart. The two nerves acting on the heart are the vagus nerve, which slows heart rate down by emitting acetylcholine, and the accelerans nerve which speeds it up by emitting noradrenaline. This results in an increased bloodflow, preparing the body for a sudden increase in activity. These nerve fibres are part of the autonomic nervous system, part of the 'fight or flight' system.

References

Nerves
Autonomic nervous system